Alabay Statue is a gilded statue that stands on Ashgabat, Turkmenistan. The 49 feet (15 m) tall gilded statue (the statue itself is 29 feet, the pedestal is 20 feet), depicts a Alabay dog. The statue was created by Turkmen artist Sargart Babaev with the President Gurbanguly Berdimuhamedow's initiative in 2020.

Appearance
The height of the dog's figure is 6 meters, it is installed on a pedestal 9 meters high. The 15-meter monument is located on an area with a diameter of 36 meters.

It is installed at a roundabout along Magtymguly Avenue, in a vast area between Taslama and Tehran streets.

History
The idea to erect a monument appeared in 2017, several designs of the monument were presented in October.

Construction began in 2019 and completed in autumn 2020.

The official opening of the monument "Alabay Statue" took place in November 2020 near the residential complex.

References

External links
Berdimuhamedov's poem dedicated to Alabay

Buildings and structures in Ashgabat
2020 sculptures
Asian sculpture
Colossal statues
Sculptures of dogs